The 2022 Houston Baptist Huskies softball team represented Houston Baptist University during the 2022 NCAA Division I softball season. The Huskies played their home games at Husky Field and were led by thirtieth year head coach Mary-Ellen Hall. They were members of the Southland Conference.

This was the Huskies' final season as Houston Baptist. On September 21, 2022, the university announced it had adopted the new name of Houston Christian University. The Huskies nickname was not affected.

Preseason

Southland Conference Coaches Poll
The Southland Conference Coaches Poll was released on February 4, 2022. Houston Baptist was picked to finish fourth in the Southland Conference with 102 votes.

Preseason All-Southland team

First Team
Caitlyn Brockway (HBU, JR, 1st Base)
Cayla Jones (NSU, SR, 2nd Base)
Lindsey Rizzo (SELA, SR, 3rd Base)
Ashleigh Sgambelluri (TAMUCC, JR, Shortstop)
Chloe Gomez (MCNS, SO, Catcher)
Kaylee Lopez (MCNS, JR, Designated Player)
Jil Poullard (MCNS, SO, Outfielder)
Audrey Greely (SELA, SO, Outfielder)
Aeriyl Mass (SELA, SR, Outfielder)
Pal Egan (TAMUCC, JR, Outfielder)
Lyndie Swanson (HBU, R-FR, Pitcher)
Whitney Tate (MCNS, SO, Pitcher)
Jasie Roberts (HBU, R-FR, Utility)

Second Team
Haley Moore (TAMUCC, SO, 1st Base)
Shelby Echols (HBU, SO, 2nd Base)
Autumn Sydlik (HBU, JR, 3rd Base)
Keely DuBois (NSU, SO, Shortstop)
Bailey Krolczyk (SELA, SO, Catcher)
Lexi Johnson (SELA, SO, Designated Player)
Toni Perrin (MCNS, SR, Outfielder)
Cam Goodman (SELA, SO, Outfielder)
Alexandria Torres (TAMUCC, SO, Outfielder)
Ashley Vallejo (MCNS, SO, Pitcher)
Heather Zumo (SELA, SR, Pitcher)
Beatriz Lara (TAMUCC, JR, Pitcher)
Melise Gossen (NICH, JR, Utility)

Personnel

Schedule and results

Schedule Source:*Rankings are based on the team's current ranking in the NFCA/USA Softball poll.

References

Houston Baptist
Houston Christian Huskies softball
Houston Baptist Huskies softball